Silis difficilis is a species of soldier beetle in the family Cantharidae. It is found in North America.

Subspecies
These two subspecies belong to the species Silis difficilis:
 Silis difficilis difficilis b
 Silis difficilis flavida b
Data sources: i = ITIS, c = Catalogue of Life, g = GBIF, b = Bugguide.net

References

Further reading

 

Cantharidae
Articles created by Qbugbot
Beetles described in 1850